Steven K. Feiner is an American computer scientist, serving as Professor for computer science at Columbia University in the field of computer graphics. He is well-known for his research in augmented reality (AR), and co-author of Computer Graphics: Principles and Practice. He directs the Columbia University Computer Graphics and User Interface Lab.

Biography
Feiner earned a bachelor's degree from Brown University in 1973, and received his Ph.D. from Brown in 1985.

Recognition
Feiner was elected as an ACM Fellow in 2018 for "contributions to human-computer interaction, virtual and augmented reality, and 3D user interfaces".

References

Living people
Columbia University faculty
Computer graphics researchers
Human–computer interaction researchers
Virtual reality pioneers
Fellows of the Association for Computing Machinery
Year of birth missing (living people)
Brown University alumni